David Glenn Jenkins (born March 7, 1971) is an American politician, a helicopter pilot, and former police officer from Georgia. Jenkins is a Republican member of Georgia House of Representatives for District 132.

Education 
In 2008, Jenkins earned a Bachelor’s Degree in Technical Management from Embry Riddle Aeronautical University.

Career 
Jenkins is a former Clayton County police officer. In early 2000 Jenkins started training to become a helicopter pilot in the United States Army. He graduated from Warrant Officer School and went on to serve with the 101st Airborne Division , nicknamed the "Screaming Eagles" at Fort Campbell, KY as a Chinook Pilot.  Jenkins is now a life-flight helicopter pilot.

On November 3, 2020, Jenkins won the election and became a Republican member of Georgia House of Representatives for District 132. Jenkins defeated the Georgia Minority House Leader Bob Trammell.

Personal life 
Jenkins' wife is Catherine Jenkins. They live near Luthersville, on their farm, Jenkins Farms Meriwether County, Georgia.

References

External links 
 David Jenkins at votedavidjenkins.com
 David Jenkins at ballotpedia.org

21st-century American politicians
Embry–Riddle Aeronautical University alumni
Living people
Republican Party members of the Georgia House of Representatives
People from Meriwether County, Georgia
1971 births